= Vyron Vasileiadis =

Vyron Vasileiadis (Greek: Βύρων Βασιλειάδης) is a Greek businessman and shipowner. He is the founder and chairman of V Group of Companies, a business group active in environmental services, waste management, port reception facilities and shipping. From 2025 onward, his business profile became increasingly associated with international shipping through Venergy Maritime, which expanded from initial tanker acquisitions into a broader newbuilding programme covering MR product tankers, LR2 tankers, suezmax tankers and feeder container vessels at shipyards in South Korea and China. He is also associated with the expansion of environmental services in the Suez Canal through Antipollution Egypt.

== Early life and education ==
Vasileiadis studied business administration at the American College of Greece and later completed the Executive Program on Global Leadership and Public Policy at the Harvard Kennedy School. Greek media have described him as a self-made entrepreneur who began his career as a dockworker at the port of Piraeus before moving into the management and expansion of Antipollution.

== Career ==
Greek media reported that Vasileiadis was involved in Antipollution from an early stage and later helped expand the business from ship-generated waste collection in Piraeus into a broader environmental-services platform active in Greece and abroad.

An important stage in the international expansion of the group came through Egypt. In 2024, Lloyd's List reported that Antipollution Egypt, a joint venture involving V Group, launched the vessel Eco Suez I after the group had won an international tender to provide a comprehensive waste-management and environmental response service for the Suez Canal. In 2026, Lloyd's List reported that Antipollution Egypt was launching an end-to-end hazardous-waste service for vessels transiting the canal as part of Egypt's wider "Green Canal 2030" plan.

Vasileiadis entered shipowning through Venergy Maritime in 2025. TradeWinds reported that the company acquired its first modern MR tanker in April 2025 and a second MR tanker later the same month. During the second half of 2025 and early 2026, Venergy expanded into newbuilding orders in South Korea and China. TradeWinds reported in November 2025 that the company had signed letters of intent for up to a dozen product tankers and container ships, and in February 2026 that its orderbook had grown to 10 vessels. Days later, the publication reported that Venergy had increased its LR2 tanker orderbook from two to six vessels at New Times Shipbuilding.

In the container segment, TradeWinds reported in February 2026 that the group's shipping investment tally was nearing $1 billion after fresh orders for 1,900-TEU feeder vessels in China. In March 2026, TradeWinds reported that the company was plotting its suezmax tanker debut, with 22 firm and optional shipbuilding contracts across feeder container ships, LR2 tankers and suezmaxes. In April 2026, the publication further reported that he had ordered up to six suezmaxes at two yards under China State Shipbuilding Corporation.

Alongside the shipping expansion, the group also continued to develop environmental infrastructure in Greece. In March 2026, ProtoThema English reported that Antipollution was developing a hazardous-waste-management facility in Ritsona intended to serve shipping, refineries, energy infrastructure, logistics hubs and industrial operations.
